The Savage State (or L'état sauvage) is a French drama film directed by Francis Girod.

Plot
In 1960, Minister of Information of a progressive African state still under French colonial rule, the doctor Patrice Doumbe also fighting against the compromises of his own government. Avit Laurençon happens, international official mission as spouses and Laurence, a French whose connection with Doumbe people talking the colony, under the eyes of his ex-lover, Gravenoire trafficker and Orlaville, the local police commissioner .

Cast

 Michel Piccoli : Orlaville
 Marie-Christine Barrault : Laurence
 Claude Brasseur : Gravenoire
 Jacques Dutronc : Avit Laurençon
 Doura Mané : Patrice Doumbe
 Rüdiger Vogler : Tristan
 Sidiki Bakaba : Cornac
 Alphonse Beni : The Minister
 Baaron : Modimbo
 Umban U'kset : Kotoko
 Jean-Baptiste Tiemele : Gohanda
 Peter Bachelier : Renard
 Philippe Brizard : Paul
 Celia : Irène
 Akonio Dolo : Elie
 Joseph Momo : Raoul

Accolades

References

External links

1978 films
1978 drama films
French drama films
1970s French films